Bithoracochaeta is a genus of house flies, in the family Muscidae. There are about 13 described species in Bithoracochaeta.

Species
These 13 species belong to the genus Bithoracochaeta:

 Bithoracochaeta annulata Stein, 1911 c g
 Bithoracochaeta atricornis Malloch, 1934 c g
 Bithoracochaeta calopus Bigot, 1885 g
 Bithoracochaeta equatorialis Couri & Marques, 2001 c g
 Bithoracochaeta flavicoxa Malloch, 1934 c g
 Bithoracochaeta leucoprocta (Wiedemann, 1830) i c g b
 Bithoracochaeta maricaensis Couri & Motta, 1995 c g
 Bithoracochaeta nigricornis Malloch, 1934 c g
 Bithoracochaeta nigricoxa Couri, 2005 c g
 Bithoracochaeta pacifera (Giglio-Tos, 1893) c g
 Bithoracochaeta plumata Albuquerque, 1955 c g
 Bithoracochaeta sociabilis Blanchard, 1937 c g
 Bithoracochaeta varicornis (Coquillett, 1900) c g

Data sources: i = ITIS, c = Catalogue of Life, g = GBIF, b = Bugguide.net

References

Further reading

 

Muscidae genera
Articles created by Qbugbot